The term slype is a variant of slip in the sense of a narrow passage; in architecture, the name for the covered passage usually found in monasteries or cathedrals between the transept and the chapter house, as at St Andrews, Winchester, Gloucester, Exeter, Durham, St. Albans, Sherborne and Christ Church Cathedral, Oxford. At St. Mary's Abbey, Dublin, it is, with the chapter house, one of only two remaining rooms.

References

Rooms
Church architecture